Spic is an ethnic slur for a person of Latino/Hispanic descent.

Spic, spik or Špik may also refer to:

SPIC (Indian company), a petrochemicals company
State Power Investment Corporation, a Chinese electricity generator
Špik, a mountain in Slovenia
Luka Špik (born 1979), a Slovenian rower
SPIC MACAY, the Society for the Promotion of Indian Classical Music And Culture Amongst Youth
Spic and Span, a U.S. household cleanser
Grind og spik, a whale meat and blubber dish of the Faroe Islands
Spähpanzer SP I.C., a 1956 West German tank

See also
Lee Spick, an English snooker player